Res gestae (Latin "things done") is a term found in substantive and procedural American jurisprudence and English law. In American substantive law, it refers to the start-to-end period of a felony. In American procedural law, it refers to a former exception to the hearsay rule for statements made spontaneously or as part of an act. The English and Canadian version of res gestae is similar, but is still recognized as a traditional exception to the hearsay rule.

Res gestae in American substantive law
In certain felony murder statutes, "res gestae" is a term defining the overall start-to-end sequence of the underlying felony.  Generally, a felony's res gestae is considered terminated when the suspect has achieved a position of relative safety from law enforcement.

Res gestae in American hearsay law

Under the Federal Rules of Evidence, res gestae may formerly have been, but is no longer, an exception to the rule against hearsay evidence based on the belief that, because certain statements are made naturally, spontaneously, and without deliberation during the course of an event, they leave little room for misunderstanding/misinterpretation upon hearing by someone else (e.g. by the witness, who will later repeat the statement to the court) and thus the courts believe that such statements carry a high degree of credibility. Statements that could be admitted into evidence as res gestae fall into three headings:

 Words or phrases that either form part of, or explain, a physical act,
 Exclamations that are so spontaneous as to belie concoction, and
 Statements that are evidence of someone's state of mind.

The Present Sense Impression, Excited Utterance, and Then-Existing Mental, Emotional, or Physical Condition hearsay exceptions now cover many situations, under the federal rules of evidence, that would formerly have been considered res gestae.

In some jurisdictions the res gestae exception has also been used to admit police sketches.

The following scenario is an example of types one and two:

Imagine a young woman (the witness) standing on the side of a main road. She sees some commotion across the street. On the opposite side of the road to her she sees an old man and hears him shout "The bank is being robbed!", as a young man runs out of a building and away down the street. The old man is never found (and so cannot appear in court to repeat what he said), but the woman repeats what she heard him say. Such a statement would be considered trustworthy for the purpose of admission as evidence because the statement was made concurrently with the event and there is little chance that the witness repeating the hearsay could have misunderstood its meaning or the speaker's intentions.

Under the Federal Rules of Evidence, res gestae may also be used to demonstrate that certain character evidence, otherwise excludable under the provisions of Rule 404, is permissible, as the events in question are part of the "ongoing narrative", or sequence of events that are necessary to define the action at hand.

Other uses

Res gestae is also used to refer to those facts or things done which form the basis or gravamen for a legal action.

Res gestae is also used in respondeat superior vicarious liability law. Particularly, res gestae refers to time, place, and in the interest of an employer.

Res Gestae is a publication of the Indiana State Bar Association.

Res Gestae is R.G. Collingwood's term for the world of human affairs (as separated from the natural world) in his The Idea Of History (1946), which deals with the philosophy of history.

Notes

Hearsay
Latin legal terminology